Bryn Mawr station is a SEPTA rapid transit station in Radnor Township, Pennsylvania. It serves the Norristown High Speed Line (Route 100) and is located at Glenbrook Avenue and County Line Road, although SEPTA gives the location as being at Bryn Mawr Avenue and Brook Street. Local, Hughes Park Express, and Norristown Express trains stop at Bryn Mawr, and during rush hour, some trains coming from the 69th Street Terminal terminate there. The station lies near Bryn Mawr Hospital. The station has off-street parking available.

Station layout

Gallery

References

External links

Bryn Mawr Route 100 Station (The Subway Nut.com)

SEPTA Norristown High Speed Line stations
Radnor Township, Delaware County, Pennsylvania
Railway stations in the United States opened in 1907